Peterman is an unincorporated community in Houston County, Alabama, United States, located  west-southwest of downtown Dothan.

References

Unincorporated communities in Houston County, Alabama
Unincorporated communities in Alabama